is a role-playing video game for the Nintendo 3DS, based on the Dragon Ball franchise. It was released in Japan on August 4, 2016 with a localized version being released in North America on November 22, 2016. Dragon Ball Fusions was released in Europe, the Middle East, and Australasian territories on February 17, 2017.

Gameplay
Dragon Ball Fusions allows players to create their own character, build teams, and collect Dragon Ball characters to fuse and create new ones to use during battles. It also allows players to take a photograph of themselves or their friends and fuse them.

Development

North American localization
In the game's North American release, all swords in the game had been replaced with sticks. Though no explanation as to why this change was made, a representative of Bandai Namco told Operation Rainfall that the decision was made by Nintendo and Bandai Namco.

Manga
A manga adaptation titled  was serialized in Saikyō Jump magazine from its May 2016 issue published in April 2016 to its May 2018 issue published in April 2018. Written and illustrated by Hiroshi Otoki, the story followed Tekka as he and his friend Pinich gather the Dragon Balls to wish for a "Number One in Time Space Martial Arts Tournament."

Reception 

The game received "mixed" reviews, according to the review aggregator website Metacritic, receiving a rating of 72/100 based on 37 critics.

Kyle Hilliard of Game Informer awarded Dragon Ball Fusions a 6.75 out of 10, praising the gameplay and graphics while criticizing the battles and requirements for EX Fusions as "time-consuming".

Heidi Kemps of GameSpot awarded the game a 6 out of 10, criticizing the lack of English voice acting, the battle animations for being "repetitive" and the game itself for feeling like a companion to Dragon Ball Xenoverse.

The game sold 77,509 copies within its first week of release in Japan. As of October 13, 2016, it has sold 174,184 copies in the region. By 2018, it had sold 240,568 copies in Japan.

Notes

References 

2016 video games
Bandai Namco games
Fusions
Ganbarion games
Japanese role-playing video games
Nintendo 3DS eShop games
Nintendo 3DS games
Nintendo 3DS-only games
Shueisha franchises
Single-player video games
Video games developed in Japan
Video games featuring protagonists of selectable gender